James Robert Johnstone (born September 20, 1960) is an American former professional basketball player. He played at center or forward. Johnstone played for the National Basketball Association's San Antonio Spurs and Detroit Pistons in 1982–83.

Born in New Canaan, Connecticut, Johnstone attended Lewiston-Porter Central School District in Youngstown, New York and attended college at Wake Forest University from 1978 to 1982.

He was drafted by the Kansas City Kings in the third round of the 1982 NBA draft. Johnstone played in 23 games for the Spurs and Pistons.

References

External links
NBA Stats at Basketball-Reference.com

1960 births
Living people
American expatriate basketball people in France
American expatriate basketball people in Italy
American men's basketball players
Basketball players from Connecticut
Centers (basketball)
Detroit Pistons players
Kansas City Kings draft picks
Le Mans Sarthe Basket players
Mens Sana Basket players
Ohio Mixers players
People from New Canaan, Connecticut
Power forwards (basketball)
San Antonio Spurs players
Scaligera Basket Verona players
Wake Forest Demon Deacons men's basketball players